The Singles Collection, Volume 1 is a limited edition CD series compilation box set by the English rock band Queen, released in 2008. The box set contains remastered versions of the first 13 worldwide top-40 charting singles released by Queen, including b-sides.

Track listing
Disc one
"Keep Yourself Alive" – 3:46
"Son and Daughter" – 3:19

Disc two
"Seven Seas of Rhye" – 2:47
"See What a Fool I've Been" – 4:29

Disc three
"Killer Queen" – 3:00
"Flick of the Wrist" – 3:19

Disc four
"Now I'm Here" – 4:12
"Lily of the Valley" – 1:40

Disc five
"Bohemian Rhapsody" – 5:55
"I'm in Love with My Car" – 3:12

Disc six
"You're My Best Friend" – 2:52
"'39" – 3:30

Disc seven
"Somebody to Love" – 4:56
"White Man" – 4:59

Disc eight
"Tie Your Mother Down" – 3:45
"You and I" – 3:25

Disc nine (Queen's First E.P.)
"Good Old-Fashioned Lover Boy" – 2:53
"Death on Two Legs (Dedicated To...)" – 3:43
"Tenement Funster" – 3:00
"White Queen (As It Began)" – 4:34

Disc ten
"We Are the Champions" – 3:04
"We Will Rock You" – 2:02

Disc eleven
"Spread Your Wings" – 4:35
"Sheer Heart Attack" – 3:25

Disc twelve
"Bicycle Race" – 3:02
"Fat Bottomed Girls" – 3:23

Disc thirteen
"Don't Stop Me Now" – 3:31
"In Only Seven Days" – 2:31

References

External links
 Queen official website: Discography: Singles Collection Vol. 1: includes lyrics of "See What a Fool I've Been".

Queen (band) compilation albums
2008 compilation albums